Markinch is a village in the Canadian province of Saskatchewan within the Rural Municipality of Cupar No. 218 and Census Division No. 6. It is located about 68 km north of the City of Regina. It was named by settlers for Markinch, Scotland.

The first European settlers in the district were Paul Blaser and Tom Bradwell in 1900. The railway from Brandon, reached Markinch in 1905 and highway 22 was completed in 1930.
Markinch was established with the coming of the railroad.  The population in 1906/07 was 40 people and reached its height in 1921 with 175 people.

History 
Markinch incorporated as a village on February 16, 1911.

Demographics 

See also 

 List of communities in Saskatchewan
 Villages of Saskatchewan

Footnotes

Villages in Saskatchewan
Cupar No. 218, Saskatchewan
Division No. 6, Saskatchewan